is a Prefectural Natural Park on the coast of Mie Prefecture, Japan. Established in 1953, the park spans the municipalities of Suzuka and Tsu.

See also
 National Parks of Japan
 Ise-Shima National Park

References

Parks and gardens in Mie Prefecture
Protected areas established in 1953
1953 establishments in Japan